Andrei Ioan Dumitraș (born 23 January 1988) is a Romanian professional footballer who plays as a right back or centre back for Liga III club Bucovina Rădăuți.

Club career

Dumitraș started his football career in 2005, playing for Laminorul Roman in the Romanian Liga II. After that, he moved to Ceahlăul Piatra Neamţ.

Ceahlăul Piatra Neamț

In January 2010, Dumitraş was sold to Ceahlăul Piatra Neamţ. Here became an important player, and in second part of 2011–12 season, he was named captain of the team.

Steaua București
On 22 May 2012, he signed a 5-year contract with Steaua București who paid €350,000 for his services. He made his debut for the club on 23 July 2012, in a 1–0 win with Concordia Chiajna. On 30 August 2012, he scored one goal for Steaua in a 3-0 victory against FK Ekranas, in UEFA Europa League 2012-13 qualifiers.

On 19 December 2012, Dumitraș signed a 5-year deal with his former club, Ceahlăul Piatra Neamț. In January 2015, Dumitraș was transferred to Universitatea Craiova for an undisclosed fee.

Honours

Steaua București 
Liga I: 2012–13

Dante Botoșani 
Liga III: 2021–22

References

External links
 
 
 

1988 births
Living people
Romanian footballers
Association football defenders
Liga I players
Liga II players
Liga III players
CSM Ceahlăul Piatra Neamț players
FC Steaua București players
CS Universitatea Craiova players
FC Viitorul Constanța players
FC Botoșani players
CS Concordia Chiajna players
CSM Reșița players